Rye Neck High School is a public secondary school located in the Village of Mamaroneck, New York and the Town of Rye, New York. It is part of the Rye Neck Union Free School District and is connected to Rye Neck Middle School. Rye Neck High School offers 25 Advanced Placement classes as well as many electives such as robotics, journalism, and video production.

Sports
In 2017 the Rye Neck Boys Varsity Soccer team won the Section 1 Class B championship. The team advanced to the regional final, falling to Center Moriches.
Rye Neck High School was ranked #140 on Newsweeks 2015 list of the Best High Schools in America
Rye Neck High School was second runner-up for USA Weekends 2007 "Showstopper Contest" for best high school musical, with their performance of Thoroughly Modern Millie. This beat out over 700 other entries.
Four students from Rye Neck High School competed on The Challenge on News12 Westchester.
Rye Neck Varsity Boys Soccer '09-'10 have won the Section 1 Class B Championship with a 3 to 1 victory over Edgemont but fell to 2–1 loss in their Regional Final, which was the farthest they have been in over a decade.
Rye Neck Varsity Boys Soccer '10-'11 made it to the sectional finals (class B) for the 3rd year in a row.
Rye Neck's High School Mock trial team has won numerous state championships and regional championships in recent years.
In 2020, it was announced that long time Rye Neck HS Varsity Softball Coach, Joan Spedafino, was selected for induction into the New York State High School Softball Hall of Fame, as part of the Induction Class of 2021. In 2013 Rye Neck's football team won the League and Section 1 Class C Championship, went on to win class C Regional Finals. Played in the Class C State Championship in the Carrier Dome only to lose to New York State perennial power Chenango Forks by the score of 28-27 finishing with a school best 11–1 record.

Notable alumni
 Donna Rubin (born 1959), tennis player

See also
 Immediato v. Rye Neck School District

References

External links
Rye Neck Union Free School District

Mamaroneck, New York
Public high schools in Westchester County, New York